Francisque Collomb (Saint-Rambert-en-Bugey, Ain 19 December 1910 – Lyon, 24 July 2009) was a French politician and the Mayor of Lyon from 1976 to 1989.

1910 births
2009 deaths
People from Ain
Mayors of Lyon
Politicians from Auvergne-Rhône-Alpes
Officiers of the Légion d'honneur
20th-century French politicians
Senators of Rhône (department)
Union for French Democracy politicians